Sacacoyo is a municipality in the La Libertad department of El Salvador.

History
The name Sacacoyo comes from the Nahua phrase "En el camino de coyotes y zacate" (in the path of coyotes and grass) In 1890, Sacacoyo had a population of 1,870 people. In 1905, Sacacoyo was combined as part of Tepecoyo, but on 11 May 1907 was recreated as Sacacoyo by legislative decree.

Geography
Administrative divisions:

Sacacoyo is made up of three cantons:
 Ateos (historically  Atehuan)
 Buena Vista
 La Montañita

References

Municipalities of the La Libertad Department (El Salvador)